Vaneča  is a settlement north of Puconci in the Prekmurje region of Slovenia.

There is a small neoromanesque chapel in the settlement. It was built in the early 20th century and has a three-story belfry with arched windows on all sides.

Notable people
Notable people that were born or lived in Vaneča include:
Mihály Szever Vanecsai (ca. 1699–1750), writer

References

External links
Vaneča on Geopedia

Populated places in the Municipality of Puconci